Keyuo Boderek Craver (born August 22, 1980) is a former American football defensive back. In January 2015, he joined the Omaha Beef of Champions Indoor Football as an assistant coach.

Playing career
He played high school football at Harleton High School in Harleton, Texas. He also won state in the triple jump.  While he wanted to play football for Texas A&M, he received a full scholarship from college football the University of Nebraska and was selected in the fourth round (125th overall) of the 2002 NFL Draft by the New Orleans Saints.

Craver spent three seasons with the Saints where he started 22 total games. He recorded 22 tackles and three assists while with the team. A highlight of Craver's time with the Saints came in 2002 when he scooped up a fumble and raced in for a touchdown against the Packers. Craver played 2 seasons with the Edmonton Eskimos of the Canadian Football League.

In 2010, the Winnipeg Blue Bombers decided to move Craver to the inside halfback position. This move came at the expense of shutdown corner Lenny Walls.

College statistics

References

1980 births
Living people
American football cornerbacks
American players of Canadian football
Canadian football defensive backs
Edmonton Elks players
Nebraska Cornhuskers football players
New Orleans Saints players
Sportspeople from Dallas
Players of American football from Dallas
Players of Canadian football from Dallas
Winnipeg Blue Bombers players
Arizona Rattlers players